André Glatigny (28 May 1914 – 24 August 2003) was a French middle-distance runner. He competed in the men's 1500 metres at the 1936 Summer Olympics.

References

External links
 

1914 births
2003 deaths
Athletes (track and field) at the 1936 Summer Olympics
French male middle-distance runners
Olympic athletes of France
20th-century French people